Arenibacter echinorum is a heterotrophic and aerobic bacterium from the genus Arenibacter which has been isolated from the sea urchin Strongylocentrotus intermedius from the Sea of Japan.

References

External links
Type strain of Arenibacter echinorum at BacDive -  the Bacterial Diversity Metadatabase	

Flavobacteria
Bacteria described in 2007